This is a list of the tallest destroyed buildings and structures in the United Kingdom. The list consists only of free standing structures; the numerous guyed radio masts and towers that have been demolished or destroyed are excluded.

An equal sign (=) following a rank indicates the same height between two or more buildings.

See also
 List of tallest buildings in the United Kingdom
 List of tallest structures in the United Kingdom
 List of tallest buildings and structures in the United Kingdom by usage

References

 
Destroyed